The Stenomatinae are a subfamily of small moths in the family Depressariidae.

Taxonomy and systematics

 Agriophara Rosenstock, 1885
 Amontes Viette, 1958
 Anadasmus Walsingham, 1897
 Anapatris Meyrick, 1932
 Antaeotricha Zeller, 1854
 Aproopta Turner, 1919
 Baeonoma Meyrick, 1916
 Catarata Walsingham, 1912
 Cerconota Meyrick, 1915
 Chlamydastis Meyrick, 1916
 Dinotropa Meyrick, 1916
 Energia Walsingham, 1912
 Eriogenes Meyrick, 1925
 Falculina Zeller, 1877
 Gonioterma Walsingham, 1897
 Herbulotiana Viette, 1954
 Hyalopseustis Meyrick, 1925
 †Hexerites Cockerell, 1933
 Lethata Duckworth, 1964
 Loxotoma Zeller, 1854
 Menesta Clemens, 1860
 Menestomorpha Walsingham, 1907
 Mocquerysiella Viette, 1954
 Mothonica Walsingham, 1912
 Mysaromima Meyrick, 1926
 Nothochalara Diakonoff, 1954
 Orphnolechia Meyrick, 1909
 Parascaeas Meyrick, 1936
 Paraspastis Meyrick, 1915
 Petalothyrsa Meyrick, 1931
 Petasanthes Meyrick, 1925
 Phelotropa Meyrick, 1915
 Phylomictis Meyrick, 1890
 Promenesta Busck, 1914
 Proscedes Diakonoff, 1954
 Rectiostoma Becker, 1982
 Rhodanassa Meyrick, 1915
 Stenoma Zeller, 1839
 Thioscelis Meyrick, 1909
 Timocratica Meyrick, 1912
 Zetesima Walsingham, 1912

References

 , 1964: North American Stenomidae (Lepidoptera: Gelechioidea). Proceedings of the United States National Museum, 116: 23–54. Full article: .
 , 1964: Neotropical Microlepidoptera, IV: A New Genus of Stenomidae with Descriptions of Four New Species (Lepidoptera: Gelechioidea). Proceedings of the United States National Museum, 116: 97–109. Full article: .
 , 1969: Bredin-Archbold-Smithsonian biological survey of Dominica: West Indian Stenomidae (Lepidoptera: Gelechioidea). Smithsonian Contributions to Zoology 4: 1-21. Full article: 
  1973: The Old World Stenomidae: a preliminary survey of the fauna, notes on relationships, and revision of the genus Eriogenes (Lepidoptera: Gelechioidea). Smithsonian contributions to zoology, (147) full article (PDF)

External links

 
Moth subfamilies